The 2016 ICC World Twenty20 was the sixth edition of the ICC World Twenty20, the world championship of Twenty20 International cricket. It was held in India from 8 March to 3 April 2016, and was the first edition to be hosted by India.

Seven cities hosted matches in the tournament – Bangalore, Dharamshala, Kolkata, Mohali, Mumbai, Nagpur, and New Delhi. For the second time, there were 16 participating teams, 10 of which qualified automatically due to their status as full members of the International Cricket Council (ICC), and another six qualifying through the 2015 World Twenty20 Qualifier. The tournament was divided into three stages. In the first stage, the eight lowest-ranked teams played off, with the top two joining the eight highest-ranked teams in the Super 10 stage. Finally, the top four teams overall contested the knockout stage. In the final, played at Eden Gardens, Kolkata, the West Indies defeated England by four wickets. Indian batsman Virat Kohli was named the player of the tournament, while Bangladesh's Tamim Iqbal and Afghanistan's Mohammad Nabi led the tournament in runs and wickets, respectively.

Teams 
For the second time, the tournament featured 16 teams. All ten full members qualified automatically, joined by the six associate members: Ireland, Scotland, Netherlands, Afghanistan, Hong Kong and Oman who all qualified through the 2015 ICC World Twenty20 Qualifier, played in Ireland and Scotland between 6 and 26 July 2015. Oman made its debut in the tournament.

The top eight Full Member nations in the ICC T20I Championship rankings as of 30 April 2014 automatically progressed to the Super 10 stage, with the remaining eight teams competing in the group stage. From the group stage, Bangladesh and associate nation Afghanistan advanced to the Super 10 stage. Test playing nation Zimbabwe and Ireland failed to advance to the Super 10 stage for the second time.

In October 2015 Shahryar Khan, chairman of the Pakistan Cricket Board (PCB), said that Pakistan would consider pulling out of the tournament if the series against India did not go ahead. Although the series was ultimately cancelled, Pakistan received government clearance in February 2016 to visit India to compete in the tournament. In early March, Pakistan sent a delegation to assess the security arrangements ahead of the tournament. Following the visit, the match between India and Pakistan was moved from Dharamsala to Eden Gardens in Kolkata, at the request of the PCB, and on 11 March, Pakistan confirmed their participation at the tournament.

Match officials 
The match referees’ responsibilities throughout the men's tournament were shared between six members of the Elite Panel of ICC Referees :

  David Boon
  Chris Broad
  Javagal Srinath
  Jeff Crowe
  Ranjan Madugalle
  Andy Pycroft

The on-field responsibilities for officiating the men's tournament were shared by all 12 of the Elite Panel of ICC Umpires and three umpires from the International Panel of ICC Umpires :

Australia
  Bruce Oxenford
  Paul Reiffel
  Rod Tucker

England
  Michael Gough
  Ian Gould
  Richard Illingworth
  Richard Kettleborough
  Nigel Llong

India
  Sundaram Ravi

New Zealand
  Chris Gaffaney

Pakistan
  Aleem Dar

South Africa
  Johan Cloete
  Marais Erasmus

Sri Lanka
  Kumar Dharmasena

West Indies
  Joel Wilson

Squads 

Prior to the tournament, each team selected a squad of 15 players.

Venues 
On 21 July 2015, the Indian cricket board announced the name of the cities which will be hosting the matches. Bangalore, Chennai, Dharamshala, Mohali, Mumbai, Nagpur and New Delhi were the venues along with Kolkata, which also hosted the final of the event. Chennai could not host a match due to legal issues regarding the construction of three stands at the M. A. Chidambaram Stadium. VCA Stadium, Nagpur hosted all Group B games and HPCA Stadium, Dharamshala hosted all Group A matches. The India vs Pakistan match, was scheduled to be played at HPCA Stadium. With the announcement that HPCA authority could not provide the required security for Pakistani team, the match was moved to Eden Gardens, Kolkata.

There were some initial concerns about the Feroz Shah Kotla stadium in Delhi hosting the first semi-final, due to one of the block of stands needing a clearance certificate from the South Delhi Municipal Corporation (SDMC). If the clearance was not approved, the ICC and BCCI were planning an alternative venue to host the match. However, on 23 March, the Delhi & District Cricket Association were granted clearance from the SDMC to use the block at the Feroz Shah Kotla.

Prize money 
The 2016 ICC World Twenty20 declared a total prize money pool of $10 million for the tournament, 33% more than the 2014 edition. The prize money was distributed according to the performance of the teams as follows:

Warm-up matches 

The following warm-up matches for the 2016 ICC World Twenty20 were played between 3 March and 15 March between all participants.

First round 
All times listed below are in Indian Standard Time (UTC+05:30).

Group A

Group B

Super 10

Group 1

Group 2

Knockout stage 
Due to security concerns, the ICC stated that if Pakistan finished second in Group 2, the two semi final venues would be switched.

Semi-finals

Final 

England and the West Indies were both contesting the tournament final for a second time, having won one previous tournament each (in 2010 and 2012, respectively). West Indian captain Darren Sammy won the toss and elected to bowl, as he had done throughout the tournament. England posted a total of 155/9 from their 20 overs, with Joe Root top-scoring with 54 runs from 36 balls. For the West Indies, Carlos Brathwaite took 3/23 and Samuel Badree took 2/16, including a maiden. The West Indies subsequently reached their target with just two balls to spare. They required 19 runs from the final over, bowled by Ben Stokes, which Brathwaite reached by hitting four consecutive sixes. Marlon Samuels scored 85 not out from 66 balls – the highest score in World T20 final history – and was named the final's Man of the Match for the second time. The match was played to a near-capacity crowd, with 66,000 people in attendance.

Statistics 
The leading run-scorer in the tournament was Tamim Iqbal, with 295, and the highest wicket-taker Mohammad Nabi with 12.
The top-five in each category are:

Most runs

Most wickets

Team of the tournament

References

External links 
 ICC World Twenty20 2016 Official Website
 ICC World Twenty20 2016 on ESPNcricinfo

 
2016
ICC World Twenty20
International cricket competitions in India
International cricket competitions in 2015–16
ICC World Twenty20
ICC World Twenty20